Tony Wood is an American songwriter working primarily in the contemporary Christian music (CCM) genre. He has received five Gospel Music Association Dove Awards for songwriting.

Early and personal life
Wood was raised in Chase City, Virginia and graduated from Bluestone High School (Skipwith, VA) and Averett College (now University in Danville, VA.) In 1987 he graduated from Southeastern Baptist Theological Seminary (Wake Forest, NC).

Music career
His career began in 1990 when he signed a staff songwriting deal with Lorenz Creative Services (which was soon purchased and became the gospel division of BMG Music Publishing.) He was a staff writer for BMG for seven years while also serving as Minister of Youth/Music at Westwood Baptist Church in Nashville, TN. In 1998, he signed with Brentwood-Benson Music Publishing (Zomba/Universal) where he wrote exclusively until 2009 when he signed with Essential Music (SONY). From 2015 until the present he has been a staff writer for WORD Music Publishing.

Awards 
In 1998, Wood won the ASCAP Foundation's SAMMY CAHN AWARD created to commemorate the life and career of the lyricist who gave us "All The Way," "Let It Snow" and many others. This award is given yearly to an ASCAP member showing promise as a lyric writer. Other winners of this award have included John Mayer and Lori McKenna.

Wood has been nominated for the Gospel Music Association's DOVE AWARD in the Songwriter of the Year category and for having songs in SONG OF THE YEAR categories for: Rock/Contemporary Song, Pop Song, Inspirational Song, Rap/Hip Hop Song and Southern Gospel Song. He has won three times in the Inspirational Song of the Year category: FIND YOUR WINGS by Mark Harris ('08); JOSEPH by Jason Crabb ('11) and SATISFIED by Jason Crabb ('13.) He also won Musical of the Year for AS SURE AS MY REDEEMER LIVES ... SO SHALL I ('11).

In 2015 he won the Canadian Gospel Music Association's COVENANT AWARD for Pop Song of the Year for ONE SURE THING recorded by the Color.

Selected credits 
(SONG/artist/project)

CCM 
WHEN THE TIME COMES/Avalon/Stand

RING THE BELLS/Big Daddy Weave w/ Meredith Andrews/Ring The Bells

CHASING REBELS/Ben Fuller/Who I Am

SING TO THE LORD/Bob Carlisle, Steve Camp, Greg Long, Clay Crosse/DAVID: Ordinary Man…Extraordinary God

GRACE OF MY LIFE/Brian Littrell/Welcome Home

END OF ME/Building 429/Building 429

MY FATHER IN ME/CAIN/CAIN ep

TELL ME/Carrollton/Sunlight and Shadows

GOD SO LOVED THE WORLD/Charles Billingsley/Never Forsaken

LET THERE BE LIGHT/Chris August/The Upside of Down

EMPTY ME/Chris Sligh/Running Back To You

STAINED GLASS WINDOW/Cochren & Co./Don't Lose Hope

ANCHOR/Colton Dixon/Anchor

WITH A THANKFUL HEART/Don Moen/Hiding Place

THIS IS CHRISTMAS/Evan Craft/Mercy In A Manger

YOUR LOVE IS LIFE TO ME/FFH/Found A Place

LIVING SACRIFICES/First Call/Pressing On

HEAVENLY HOSTS/For King and Country/A Drummer Boy Christmas

I'M LETTING GO/Francesca Battistelli/Paper Heart

THIS IS THE STUFF/Francesca Battistelli/Hundred More Years

CHRISTMAS IS/Francesca Battistelli/Christmas

WHEN THE CRAZY KICKS IN/Francesca Battistelli/If We're Honest

AS GOOD AS GOODBYE GETS/Gary Chapman/Outside

ORDINARY DAY/Ginny Owens/Beautiful

DANGEROUS/Group 1 Crew/Fearless

CRAZY LOVE/Hawk Nelson/Crazy Love

AMEN/I Am They/I Am They

DIAMOND/Jaci Velasquez/Diamond

THREE/Jackson Michelson/single

FEARLESS/Jasmine Murray/Jasmine Murray ep

IF I SHOUT/Jason Crabb/Whatever The Road

BEFORE/Jason Crabb/Just As I Am ep

IN THE ROOM/Jon Reddick/single

BREATHE/Jonny Diaz/Everything Is Changing

REJOICE/Jordan St. Cyr/single

ADORE HIM/Kari Jobe/Worship and Adore: A Christmas Offering

I REMEMBER/Kathy Troccoli/Together

NEW EYES/Kim Hill/ The Mercy Project

EVEN IF (The Healing Doesn't Come)/Kutless/Believer

THE GREATEST OF THESE/Larnelle Harris/Live in Nashville

DISTURB US LORD/Larnelle Harris/Disturb Us Lord

MY DELIVERER/Mandisa/Freedom

BROKEN HALLELUJAH/Mandisa/Freedom

JESUS, FIRM FOUNDATION/Mark Hall, Steven Curtis Chapman, Mike Donehey, Mandisa/Jesus Firm Foundation: Hymns of Wonder

FIND YOUR WINGS/Mark Harris/The Line Between The Two

NOTHING TAKES YOU BY SURPRISE/Mark Harris/Windows and Walls

ALL THINGS POSSIBLE/Mark Schultz/All Things Possible

JESUS ONLY JESUS/Matt Redman/Passion: Let The Future Begin

WHEN I LOCK EYES WITH YOU/Maverick City Music and UPPERROOM featuring Brandon Lake and Elyssa Smith/You Hold It All Together

LET HOPE ABOUND/Melinda Doolittle/live performance on 11/5/2021 for Inauguration of Belmont University President Dr. Gregory Jones

EVEN THEN/Micah Tyler/Different

THE ONLY THING GOOD IN ME/Michael English/The Prodigal Comes Home

FREEZE THE FRAME/Michael W. Smith/Christmas At Home

SON OF GOD/Michael W. Smith/It's A Wonderful Christmas

GOD WITH GOD/Michael W. Smith/Christmas At Home

I CHOOSE JESUS/Moriah Peters/I Choose Jesus

DON'T WANNA MAKE A MOVE/Natalie Grant/Stronger

ONE TRUE GOD/NewSong''/One True God

FOLLOW JESUS/Nicole C. Mullen w/ Selah/Ultimate Collection

LOOKING FOR A GIRL/OBB/Bright Side

HEALER/Paul Baloche & Aaron Shust/Your Name

THE LONGING/Petra/Double Take

CHRIST REMAINS/Phil Driscoll/A Different Man

TOP OF MY LUNGS/Phillips, Craig and Dean/Top Of My Lungs

COME AS YOU ARE/Pocket Full of Rocks/More Than Noise

GOD FORBID/ Point of Grace/Life, Love and Other Mysteries

YES, I BELIEVE/Point of Grace/Free To Fly

WASH ME AWAY/Point of Grace/A Thousand Little Things

SAVING GRACE/Ray Boltz/Seasons Change

SOBER ME/Ronnie Freeman/God Speaking

MAKE A MOVE/Royal Tailor/Black & White

TAKE ME BACK/Ryan Stevenson/ Weathering The Storm ep

FALLING FORWARD/Sandi Patty/Falling Forward

YOU LOVE ME/Sandi Patty/Artist Of My Soul

SOMETIMES HE CALMS THE STORM/Scott Krippayne/Wild Imagination

UNREDEEMED/Selah/You Deliver Me

BEAUTIFUL TERRIBLE CROSS/Selah/You Deliver Me

JESUS FIRM FOUNDATION/Shane & Shane/The Worship Initiative, Volume 22

YOU WILL NEVER LEAVE ME/Sidewalk Prophets/These Simple Truths

HOW GLORIOUS THE LOVE OF HEAVEN/Stars Go Dim/How Glorious The Love Of Heaven

CALVARY IS THE SEA/Steve Green/Experiencing God

UNRELENTING LOVE/Susan Ashton/Experiencing God

SHOW UP, CHOOSE LOVE/TobyMac/Life After Death

SWEET JESUS/Todd Smith w/ Matthew West/Alive

RING THE BELLS/Travis Cottrell w/ Natalie Grant/Ring The Bells

EVEN THIS/Wayne Watson/Even This

GOD WITH US/We Are Messengers/God With Us ep

LOOKIN' FOR YOU/Zach Williams/A Hundred Highways

I DON'T WANT CHRISTMAS TO END/Zach Williams/I Don't Want Christmas To End

TO THE TABLE/Zach Williams/Chain Breaker

WHILE WE'RE YOUNG/1 Girl Nation/1 Girl Nation

PSALM 112/4Him/Walk On

CANDLE IN THE RAIN/4Him/Visible

GOD IS ON THE MOVE/7eventh Time Down/#godisonthemove

THERE IS A GOD/33 Miles/33 Miles

 Southern Gospel/Country Gospel 
HOLDING YOU/Bill Gaither/Homecoming Lullabies

ROOM FULL OF STORIES/Booth Brothers/Speak Jesus

WELCOME TO THE FAMILY/Booth Brothers/Room For More

REAL FAITH/Brian Free and Assurance/Real Faith

NEVER BEEN/Crabb Family/20/20

I CAN'T BELIEVE MY EYES/Gaither Vocal Band/Peace of the Rock

TRUTH IS MARCHING ON/Gold City/Revival

BREATHE DEEP/Guy Penrod/Breathe Deep

FIELDS/the Isaacs/Nature's Symphony in 432

GRACE ENOUGH/Janet Paschall/Home Again

WHAT THE BLOOD IS FOR/Jason Crabb/Love Is Stronger

GOOD LORD WILLING/Jim Brady Trio/A New Chapter

BEAUTY OF THE BLOOD/Joseph Habedank/Welcome Home

HERE HE COMES/Joseph Habedank/Resurrection

RELIGION ISN'T WORKING ANYMORE/Joseph Habedank/Change Is Coming

HOUR I FIRST BELIEVED/Karen Peck and New River/No Worries

KEEPERS/Karen Peck and New River/2:22

HELLO AFTER GOODBYE/Legacy Five/God's Been Good

FIRST CLASS, WRONG FLIGHT/Mark Lowry/Mouth in Motion

UNREDEEMED/the Martins/New Day

LITTLE IS MUCH/Michael English/Love Is The Golden Rule

WELL DONE MY CHILD/the Nelons/Right On Time

PEACE AT LAST/the Nelons/Peace At Last

NEVER NOT GOD/the Sound/God Is Real

THE MIRACLE/Russ Taff/Homecoming Lullabies

MOUNTAIN MOVER/Talley Trio/Rise Above

THE HEALER HASN'T LOST HIS TOUCH/Tribute Quartet/Living The Stories

HAS THERE EVER BEEN/Triumphant Quartet/Living In Harmony

BIGGER THAN SUNDAY/Triumphant Quartet/Bigger Than Sunday

BEST THING/Triumphant Quartet/Bigger Than Sunday

 Others 
NO BLOOD/Cledus T. Judd/ Things I Remember Before I Forget

GLITTER AND GLORY/Heidi Montag/Glitter and Glory ep

INK/Joe Diffie/Songs From Mark Twain: Words and Music

WONDER OF WONDERS/Jonathan Cain/Wonder of Wonders ep

DON'T PULL AWAY/Jessica Simpson/Jessica

IF NOT FOR THE LOVE OF CHRIST/Jim Nabors/When He Spoke

LIVE TO WORSHIP/Joy Williams/Girls of Grace

SNOW GLOBE/Matt Wertz/Snow Globe

CLOSER TO HOME/Oak Ridge Boys/Front Row Seats

SING IT NOW/Reba McEntire/Sing It Now

BETWEEN HERE AND HEAVEN/Booth Brothers w/Restless Heart/Between Here and Heaven

ALL IS WELL/Ricky Skaggs/Blessed Assurance: New Hymns of Fanny Crosby

I HEAR A WHISPER/Rob Mathes/Experiencing God

23 (The Lord Is My Shepherd/Ronan Tynan/The Dawning of the Day

OLD PHOTOGRAPHS AT CHRISTMASTIME/Todd Tilghman/Old Photographs At Christmastime

IT'S NEVER TOO LATE/Tim Rushlow/Unfinished Symphony ep

WESTERN FLYER/Western Flyer/Western Flyer

 Choir musicals 
In addition to writing individual songs for recording artists, Wood has written many seasonal musicals for church choirs. Some highlights are:

 Christmas WHAT KIND OF THRONE (Word Music)HE SHALL BE CALLED (Word Music)MY HEART LONGS FOR CHRISTMAS (Lillenas Music)JOURNEY OF FAITH (Lifeway Music)GOD SPEAKING (Benson Music)ONE QUIET NIGHT (Benson Music)JESUS: THERE'S SOMETHING ABOUT THAT NAME (Brentwood Music)

 Easter BLESSED DAWN (Word Music)AS SURE AS MY REDEEMER LIVES ... SO SHALL I (Word Music)GOD OF THE EMPTY TOMB (Benson Music)IN CHRIST ALONE (Brentwood Music)

 Patriotic AMERICAN DREAMERS (Word Music)PRAYER FOR AMERICA (Benson Music)TRUTH IS MARCHING ON''' (Benson Music)

Book 
In 2014, Wood released his first book. The devotional gift book A PARENT'S BOOK OF PRAYERS (Broadman & Holman Publishing) contains 365 prayers, one per day, based on a Biblical theme that a parent can pray for their child.

References

External links
 Official website

1961 births
Living people
American performers of Christian music
Record producers from Virginia
Musicians from Virginia
Musicians from Tennessee
Songwriters from Virginia
Songwriters from Tennessee
People from Chase City, Virginia